Plagioeciidae is a family of bryozoans, containing many genera once assigned to Diastoporidae. Extant representatives include Microecia.

References

Bryozoan families
Cyclostomatida
Extant Middle Jurassic first appearances